The waved woodpecker (Celeus undatus) is a species of bird in subfamily Picinae of the woodpecker family Picidae. It is found in Brazil, French Guiana,Guyana, Suriname, and Venezuela.

Taxonomy and systematics

The English naturalist George Edwards described and illustrated the waved woodpecker in his Gleanings of Natural History which he published in 1764. Edwards used the English name "Red-cheeked Wood-pecker". When in 1766 the Swedish naturalist Carl Linnaeus updated his Systema Naturae for the twelfth edition, he included the waved woodpecker, coined the binomial name Picus undatus, and cited Edwards's book. Linnaeus specified the type locality as Surinam [sic]. The waved woodpecker is now placed in the genus Celeus that was introduced by the German zoologist Friedrich Boie in 1831.

Three subspecies are recognized:

C. u. amacurensis Phelps & Phelps Jr, 1950
C. u. undatus (Linnaeus, 1766)
C. u. multifasciatus (Natterer & Malherbe, 1845)

However, the waved woodpecker's taxonomy is unsettled. The South American Classification Committee of the American Ornithological Society, the International Ornithological Committee, and the Clements taxonomy assign it the three subspecies above. BirdLife International's Handbook of the Birds of the World (HBW) follows the recommendation in a 2018 paper and adds four more that the other systems treat as the scaly-breasted (or scale-breasted) woodpecker, C. grammicus. This article follows the three-subspecies model.

The specific epithet undatus is Medieval Latin for "wavy" or "wavelike".

Description

Males weigh  and females . In the nominate subspecies C. u. undatus, both sexes' heads are light chestnut-rufous with a bushy crest; the crest is sometimes paler with black bars, and the ear coverts and the sides of the neck have black streaks. Males have a wide red band from behind the bill to the ear coverts; females lack it. Both sexes of adults have a cinnamon-buff chin and throat with black spots or bars. They have rufous-chestnut upperparts with wide black bars, though the rump is usually paler and yellower. Their flight feathers are black with cinnamon-rufous bars. The top side of their tail is black with rufous bars and the underside similar but duller and sometimes with a yellowish tinge. Their underparts are rufous, lighter on the belly than the breast. Their breast has irregular wavy black bars and the belly and flanks more regular bars. Both sexes have some variation in the intensity of their barring, but the female's is generally heavier than the male's. The adult's shortish bill is dull yellow to yellow-green, their iris red-brown to red, and their legs green-gray. Juveniles are very similar to adults but duller overall and have lighter barring above.

Subspecies C. u. amacurensis is darker and more chestnut than the nominate. Its head is the same shade as the body rather than paler, its rump cinnamon-rufous with no yellow, its crown without barring, and all other bars narrower. C. u. multifasciatus is the largest subspecies. It is paler and more buffy than the nominate, and has streaks rather than bars on its head, often a tail without bars, and a blackish bill with a pale mandible.

Distribution and habitat

The subspecies of the waved woodpecker are found thus:

C. u. amacurensis, northeastern Venezuela's Delta Amacuro state
C. u. undatus, eastern Venezuela, the Guianas and northeastern Brazil north of the Amazon and west of the Rio Negro
C. u. multifasciatus, northeastern Brazil south of the Amazon between central Pará and Maranhão

The waved woodpecker primarily inhabits the interior of dense rainforest though it also occurs at the forest edges, in savanna, and along rivers. In elevation it is mostly found below .

Behavior

Movement

The waved woodpecker is a year-round resident throughout its range.

Feeding

The waved woodpecker's primary food is ants and termites; it also eats seeds, fruits, and berries. It usually forages singly or in pairs but does sometimes join mixed-species feeding flocks. In the forest interior it mostly forages near or in the canopy.

Breeding

The waved woodpecker breeds between late May and August in the Guianas and possibly earlier southeast of there in Brazil. The clutch size, incubation period, time to fledging, and details of parental care are not known.

Vocal and non-vocal sounds

The waved woodpecker's song is a "high, nasal, 'fuweét-eeuh'." it also makes a "soft, whispered 'kowahair', rising in pitch". Both sexes drum

Status

The IUCN follows HBW taxonomy and so has assessed the combined waved and scaly-breasted woodpeckers as a single species. Combined they have a very large range. The population size is not known and is believed to be decreasing through habitat loss due to deforestation for agriculture and ranching. The waved woodpecker sensu stricto is uncommon and poorly known; it does occur in some protected areas.

References

External links

waved woodpecker
Birds of the Guianas
Birds of the Amazon Basin
waved woodpecker
waved woodpecker
Birds of Brazil
Taxonomy articles created by Polbot